Noël de la Cruz (born 20 June 1968) is a Cuban former cyclist. He competed in the team pursuit at the 1992 Summer Olympics.

References

External links
 

1968 births
Living people
Cuban male cyclists
Olympic cyclists of Cuba
Cyclists at the 1992 Summer Olympics
Place of birth missing (living people)
Pan American Games medalists in cycling
Pan American Games gold medalists for Cuba
Medalists at the 1991 Pan American Games